University Hospitals Sussex NHS Foundation Trust is an NHS foundation trust which provides clinical services to people in Brighton and Hove, parts of East Sussex and West Sussex. It is abbreviated as UHSx to avoid confusion with University Hospital Southampton NHS Foundation Trust (UHS).

History 
The trust was established on 1 April 2021 following the merger of Brighton and Sussex University Hospitals NHS Trust and Western Sussex Hospitals NHS Foundation Trust.

Hospitals 
The trust runs the following hospitals:
 Princess Royal Hospital, Haywards Heath
 Royal Alexandra Children's Hospital, Brighton
 Royal Sussex County Hospital, Brighton
 St Richard's Hospital, Chichester
 Southlands Hospital, Shoreham-by-Sea
 Sussex Eye Hospital, Brighton
 Worthing Hospital, Worthing

Additional services are run from Brighton General Hospital, Hove Polyclinic, Lewes Victoria Hospital, and a number of other satellite clinics.

Performance
In July 2022 it was reported that patients experiencing a mental health crisis had been kept in a “short stay area” of the Emergency Department at the Royal Sussex County Hospital for up to three weeks waiting for a mental health placement. It is an area with no natural light, no TV or radio and only a toilet and washbasin, with a shower available on a neighbouring ward.  Between 1 February and 16 April, the Care Quality Commission found there had been 67 days when more than 18 patients had been accommodated in corridors.  There were also many delays in emergency surgery.

References

External links 
 
 Inspection reports from the Care Quality Commission

Health in Sussex
NHS foundation trusts